Mingalazedi Pagoda (also spelt Mingalar Zedi Pagoda) is a Buddhist stupa located in Bagan, Burma. Construction started in 1274 during the reign of King Narathihapate. The pagoda is one of few temples in Bagan with a full set of glazed terra cotta tiles depicting the Jataka. The pagoda was built in brick and contains several terraces leading to large pot-shaped stupa at its centre, topped by a bejewelled umbrella (hti).  Mingalazedi Pagoda was built a few years before the First Burmese Empire (Bagan Kingdom) was pillaged by the Mongols.

References

Pagodas in Myanmar
Bagan